Serbian-Swiss are foreign relations between Serbia and Switzerland. Both countries established diplomatic relations in 1916. Switzerland has an embassy in Belgrade. Serbia has an embassy in Bern and two general consulates (in Geneva and Zürich).

There are around 200,000 people of Serbian descent living in Switzerland. The Serbs are the fourth largest foreign population in Switzerland.

Assassination plot

In 2022, Swiss media reported that one of Switzerland’s top prosecutors (Dick Marty) was the target of an assassination plot by the Serbian government and Serbian mafia.

See also 
 Foreign relations of Serbia
 Foreign relations of Switzerland
 Serbs in Switzerland

References

External links
 Serbian Ministry of Foreign Affairs about the relation with Switzerland
 Serbian embassy in Bern
 Serbian general consulate in Zurich (in German only)
 Swiss Federal Department of Foreign Affairs about the relation with Serbia
 Swiss embassy in Belgrade

 
Switzerland
Bilateral relations of Switzerland